Liu Biao (151 – September 208), courtesy name Jingsheng, was a Chinese military general, politician, and warlord who lived in the late Eastern Han dynasty of China. He is best known for serving as the Governor of Jing Province (covering present-day Hubei and Hunan) from 192 until his death in 208. He was also a member of the extended family of the Han emperors through his ancestor Liu Yu, the fifth son of Emperor Jing. Liu Biao was described as a handsome man and was over eight chi tall (1.86 metres).

Life

In 166 to 167, when Liu Biao was 17 (by East Asian reckoning), he became a student of Wang Chang (grandfather of Wang Can). At the time, Wang Chang was Administrator of Nanyang (南阳太守).

When the Han dynasty was consumed with war following the Yellow Turban Rebellion in 184, Liu Biao held the governorship of Jing Province (covering present-day Hubei and Hunan). Liu Biao later started a war against the warlord Yuan Shu and his minor vassal, Sun Jian. During the Battle of Xiangyang, Sun Jian was put in command of an army on Yuan Shu's orders to assault Liu Biao in Jing Province. Liu Biao appointed Huang Zu to command the forces against Sun Jian. Huang Zu was outmaneuvered by Sun Jian, but the latter was hit by an arrow and killed, effectively ending the battle in favour of Liu Biao's forces. Years after, Sun Jian's two eldest sons, Sun Ce and Sun Quan, caused Liu Biao no end of trouble as they sought to avenge their father's death. However, they did not cause Liu Biao's demise as they targeted Huang Zu, who was a general under Liu Biao, instead of Liu Biao himself. While Cao Cao (in the north) was gaining strength, Liu Biao chose to neither help nor hinder his conquests, in part because he had been dealt a defeat against the forces of Sun Ce at the Battle of Shaxian.

Around 200 CE, after Cao Cao's total victory over the rival warlord Yuan Shao at the Battle of Guandu, Liu Biao still remained neutral, despite being one of the only other warlords in a position to oppose the two powers. However, Liu Biao eventually decided to shelter Liu Bei, an enemy of Cao Cao and relative in deep lineage when Cao Cao defeated Yuan Shao, where Liu Bei was previously sheltered after the events of 198 (Battle of Xiapi). This made Liu Biao a target of Cao Cao's wrath as Liu Bei rebelled against Cao Cao just before the war against Yuan Shao. After Cao Cao finalised his unification of northern China in 208, he led a large army south to conquer Jing Province. With a decline in relations between Liu Biao and Liu Bei as a result of the meddling of Cai Mao's family, Liu Biao's people faced much difficulty. To make matters worse, Sun Quan's army had defeated and killed Huang Zu at the Battle of Jiangxia and ultimately destroyed Liu Biao's defences to the east.

Shortly after Cao Cao's main army began its offensive, Liu Biao died of illness, probably a back ulcer. Liu Biao's successor, his younger son Liu Cong, chose to surrender instead of resisting Cao Cao's invasion. Liu Biao's elder son, Liu Qi, who had had some disagreement with Liu Cong, joined the fleeing Liu Bei, leading to the Battle of Red Cliffs. The aftermath of that battle split Liu Biao's former domain between the three resulting power blocs. Jing Province continued to be a flash point throughout the remaining years of the Han dynasty and well into the Three Kingdoms period, due to its strategic position between all three warring factions, with multiple battles and campaigns being fought for control of the province.

Family
Liu Biao's first wife, Lady Chen, bore him two sons: Liu Qi and Liu Cong. She died early so Liu Biao took a second wife, Lady Cai from the influential Cai family in Xiangyang. As Liu Cong married Lady Cai's niece, the Cai family favoured him and wanted him to succeed his father as the Governor of Jing Province even though Liu Qi, being the elder son, should be the rightful successor. A sibling rivalry developed between Liu Cong and Liu Qi. (Note: In the 14th-century historical novel Romance of the Three Kingdoms, Liu Qi and Liu Cong are half-brothers as Liu Cong's mother is Lady Cai, but historically they were born to the same mother.)

Around mid-208, Liu Qi found an excuse to leave Xiangyang and serve as the Administrator of Jiangxia Commandery. After Liu Biao's death in late 208, Liu Cong became the new Governor of Jing Province with the support of the Cai family. Later that year, he surrendered to the warlord Cao Cao when the latter led his forces to attack Jing Province. Cao Cao then appointed him as the Inspector of Qing Province. On the other hand, Liu Qi, who was in Jiangxia Commandery, became an ally of Cao Cao's rivals Liu Bei and Sun Quan at the Battle of Red Cliffs in the winter of 208–209. After the battle, Liu Bei nominated Liu Qi to be the nominal Inspector of Jing Province, but Liu Qi died of illness later that year.

Liu Biao had at least one more son, Liu Xiu, and a daughter. Liu Xiu followed Liu Cong when the latter surrendered to Cao Cao and went to Qing Province to serve as the provincial Inspector. In 210, Liu Xiu was appointed as the Administrator of Dong'an Commandery. He composed a number of poems, rhapsodies and formal hymns. Liu Biao's daughter married Wang Can's relative Wang Kai and bore Wang Ye.

Other relatives
Liu Biao had two nephews: Liu Pan and Liu Hu.

Liu Pan participated in the battles against rival warlord Sun Ce under the command of Huang Zu, the Administrator of Jiangxia Commandery. He was defeated in battle by Taishi Ci, a general under Sun Ce. Later, after Liu Biao pacified Changsha Commandery (長沙郡; covering parts of present-day Hunan), he put Liu Pan and Huang Zhong in charge of guarding the commandery. It is not known what happened to him after that. In the 14th-century historical novel Romance of the Three Kingdoms, Liu Pan later came to serve Liu Bei through Huang Zhong's recommendation.

Liu Hu also participated in the Battle of Shaxian against Sun Ce under Huang Zu's leadership. Although many of Liu Biao's subordinates who fought in the battle were reportedly killed in action, it is not known whether Liu Hu was one of them.

In popular culture

Liu Biao is featured as one of the available warlords that the player can choose from in Creative Assembly's game Total War: Three Kingdoms.

Ji Chenggong portrayed Liu Biao in the 2010 Chinese television series Three Kingdoms.

See also
 Lists of people of the Three Kingdoms

References

Citations

Bibliography
 Chen, Shou (3rd century). Records of the Three Kingdoms (Sanguozhi).
 
 Fan, Ye (5th century). Book of the Later Han (Houhanshu).
 Pei, Songzhi (5th century). Annotations to Records of the Three Kingdoms (Sanguozhi zhu).
 Sima, Guang (1084). Zizhi Tongjian.

142 births
208 deaths
Han dynasty politicians from Shandong
Han dynasty warlords

Political office-holders in Hubei
Politicians from Jining